Vodarevu Beach is located about 6 km from Chirala on the East coast of Bay of Bengal. It is situated in Bapatla district of Andhra Pradesh. Coconut trees line the shore.
Vodarevu Beach is shortest distance beach from Hyderabad and Telangana Every week end lot of tourists from Hyderabad and Telangana visiting here.

See also 
List of beaches in India

References 

Beaches of Andhra Pradesh
Geography of Prakasam district